Laura Bernstein-Kassirer (born March 17, 1963) is an American former professional tennis player.

Bernstein grew up in both Chicago and Florida, being introduced to the sport of tennis when she moved to the latter at the age of twelve. She played two years of college tennis for the University of South Carolina, then in 1983 turned professional and competed on tour until 1989.

During her time on tour she featured in the main draw of all four grand slam tournaments. Bernstein, who has a WTA Tour win over Mary Joe Fernández to her name, had her best grand slam performance at the 1983 US Open, where she beat Elizabeth Sayers to make the second round.

References

External links
 
 

1963 births
Living people
American female tennis players
Tennis people from Illinois
Tennis people from Florida
South Carolina Gamecocks women's tennis players
People from Highland Park, Illinois
20th-century American women